Habroneuron is a genus of flowering plants belonging to the family Rubiaceae.

Its native range is Southwestern Mexico.

Species:
 Habroneuron radicans (Wernham) S.P.Darwin

References

Rubiaceae
Rubiaceae genera